The 2021 Pit Boss 250 was a NASCAR Xfinity Series race held on May 22, 2021. It was contested over 46 laps on the  road course. It was the tenth race of the 2021 NASCAR Xfinity Series season. Joe Gibbs Racing driver Kyle Busch, collected his first win of the season, and his 98th of his career.

Report

Background
Circuit of the Americas (COTA) is a grade 1 FIA-specification motorsports facility located within the extraterritorial jurisdiction of Austin, Texas. It features a  road racing circuit.  The facility is home to the Formula One United States Grand Prix, and the Motorcycle Grand Prix of the Americas, a round of the FIM Road Racing World Championship. It previously hosted the Supercars Championship, the FIA World Endurance Championship, the IMSA SportsCar Championship, and IndyCar Series.

On September 30, 2020, it was announced that COTA would host a NASCAR Xfinity Series event for the first time on May 22, 2021. The lower Xfinity and Camping World Truck Series were also added as support events. On December 11, 2020, it was announced that NASCAR would run the full 3.41 mile course.

Entry list 

 (R) denotes rookie driver.
 (i) denotes driver who is ineligible for series driver points.

Practice 

Qualifying

Qualifying results

Race

Race results

Stage Results 
Stage One
Laps: 14

Stage Two
Laps: 16

Final Stage Results 

Laps: 16

Race statistics 

 Lead changes: 6 among 5 different drivers
 Cautions/Laps: 4 for 7
 Time of race: 2 hours, 9 minutes, and 25 seconds
 Average speed:

References 

NASCAR races at Circuit of the Americas
2021 in sports in Texas
Pit Boss 250
2021 NASCAR Xfinity Series